Oleg Solomakhin (born 15 December 1971) is a Belarusian rower. He competed in the men's quadruple sculls event at the 1996 Summer Olympics.

References

1971 births
Living people
Belarusian male rowers
Olympic rowers of Belarus
Rowers at the 1996 Summer Olympics
Sportspeople from Gomel